Tropidia pygmaea is a species of hoverfly in the family Syrphidae.

Distribution
United States.

References

Eristalinae
Diptera of North America
Taxa named by Raymond Corbett Shannon
Insects described in 1926